The Over-the-Jumps Carousel, also known as the Herschell-Spillman Carousel is a historic carousel at the Little Rock Zoo in Little Rock, Arkansas.  Built in the 1920s and first exhibited at the 1924 Arkansas State Fair, it is believed to be the last operating "over-the-jumps" carousel in the world, with an original undulating wooden platform mounted on a 1960s-vintage caterpillar drive.  The horses were carved by the Allan Herschell Company.  After many years of private ownership, the carousel was acquired by a local nonprofit group and donated to the zoo in 2007.

The carousel was listed on the National Register of Historic Places in 1989.

See also
National Register of Historic Places listings in Little Rock, Arkansas

References

External links
Little Rock Zoo - Carousel

Carousels on the National Register of Historic Places
Buildings and structures on the National Register of Historic Places in Arkansas
Buildings and structures in Little Rock, Arkansas
Tourist attractions in Little Rock, Arkansas
National Register of Historic Places in Little Rock, Arkansas